Miguel José Sanz (1756–1814) was a Venezuelan lawyer and journalist.

1756 births
1814 deaths
18th-century Venezuelan lawyers
Venezuelan journalists
Venezuelan War of Independence
19th-century Venezuelan lawyers